The Roman Catholic Diocese of Plymouth is a Latin Church Roman Catholic diocese in England. The episcopal see is in the city of Plymouth, Devon, where the bishop's seat (cathedra) is located at the Cathedral Church of St Mary and St Boniface.

History
Erected as the Diocese of Plymouth in 1850 by Pope Pius IX, from the Apostolic Vicariate of the Western District, the diocese has remained jurisdictionally constant since. Since 1965, the diocese has been a suffragan see of the Ecclesiastical Province of Southwark; before then, from 1850 to 1911 it was in the Province of Westminster, then from 1911 to 1965 in the Province of Birmingham.

Details
The diocese covers the counties of Cornwall, Devon and Dorset, stretching from Penzance and the Isles of Scilly in the west, to parts of Bournemouth in the east. It is divided into five deaneries: Cornwall, Dorset, Exeter, Plymouth, and Torbay. There are chaplaincies at the universities of Bournemouth, Exeter and Plymouth.

The diocese includes the Grail Centre in Pinner in the London Borough of Harrow (which is physically in the Diocese of Westminster), a lay community of single Roman Catholic women. The Centre promotes a wider "Grail community" to include non-resident women and families, and also publishes a translation of the Psalms.

Bishops

Ordinaries

George Errington  (Appointed on 27 June 1851 – Translated to Westminster as coadjutor archbishop on 30 March 1855) 
William Vaughan  (Appointed on 10 July 1855 – Died on 24 October 1902) 
Charles Maurice Graham  (Succeeded on 25 October 1902 – Retired on 16 March 1911) 
John Joseph Keily  (Appointed on 21 April 1911 – Died on 23 September 1928) 
John Patrick Barrett  (Appointed on 7 June 1929 – Died on 2 November 1946) 
Francis Joseph Grimshaw  (Appointed on 2 June 1947 – Translated to Birmingham as metropolitan archbishop on 11 May 1954) 
Cyril Edward Restieaux  (Appointed on 9 April 1955 – Retired on 19 November 1985) 
Hugh Christopher Budd (Appointed on 19 November 1985 – Retired on 9 November 2013)
Mark O'Toole (Appointed on 9 November 2013 – Translated to Cardiff as metropolitan archbishop and Menevia on 27 April 2022)

Coadjutor Bishops
Charles Maurice Graham (1891-1902)
James Moor (1890), did not take effect

Other priests of this diocese who became bishops
Robert Brindle, appointed auxiliary bishop of Westminster in 1899
Robert Bernard Brownlow, appointed Bishop of Clifton in 1894

Churches 
Cornwall: Bodmin (SS Mary & St Petroc), Tintagel (St Paul the Apostle), Falmouth (St Mary's)

Devon: Exeter Sacred Heart, Plymouth Cathedral of St Mary and St Boniface, Torquay (Assumption of Our Lady) and Torquay (Our Lady Help of Christians and St Denis)

Dorset: Dorchester (Holy Trinity), Weymouth (St Joseph)

Monasteries, abbeys and priories: Buckfast Abbey, Ivybridge St Austin's Priory, Lanherne Carmelite Community, Sclerder Abbey

See also
 Catholic Church in England and Wales
 List of Catholic churches in the United Kingdom

External links

Roman Catholic Diocese of Plymouth website
Plymouth Cathedral
Grail Centre website
GCatholic.org

 
1850 establishments in England
Plymouth, Devon
Religion in Dorset
Religious organisations based in England
Religious organizations established in 1850
Roman Catholic dioceses and prelatures established in the 19th century
Christianity in Cornwall
Christianity in Devon
Roman Catholic Ecclesiastical Province of Southwark